The Kink is a manmade feature of the North Fork Fortymile River in remote eastern Alaska.  It is a channel that was blasted through a rock ridge by gold miners in 1904, in the belief that bypassing a horseshoe-shaped meander in the river's natural flow would reveal gold deposits. The effort was unsuccessful. 

The area includes the remnants of a small mining camp.  The creation of the channel was a major engineering feat of the time, given the remote location and harsh climate (conditions that continue to apply today).

The Kink was listed on the National Register of Historic Places in 1975.

See also
National Register of Historic Places listings in Southeast Fairbanks Census Area, Alaska

References

Buildings and structures completed in 1904
Canals on the National Register of Historic Places in Alaska
Southeast Fairbanks Census Area, Alaska
Buildings and structures on the National Register of Historic Places in Southeast Fairbanks Census Area, Alaska